Alexander James Whitmore (born 7 September 1995) is an English professional footballer who plays for AFC Fylde, as a central defender.

After playing youth football with Wallsend Boys Club, Whitmore turned professional with Burnley in 2014, and had spells at Chester, Gateshead, Morecambe, Bury and Chesterfield. He signed for Grimsby Town in May 2018 before joining current club AFC Fylde in June 2019.

Career
Born in Newcastle upon Tyne, Whitmore started his career with local youth side Wallsend Boys Club, where he played until the age of sixteen. In July 2012, he joined Burnley on a two-year scholarship deal. He progressed through the youth side and was named as captain in his second season at the club, signing his first professional contract in March 2014. He was moved into the development squad and remained there for one season before he signed a new one-year contract extension in April 2015. He received a place in the first team squad for the pre-season tour of Scotland in the summer of 2015.

In November 2015, he joined National League side Chester on a one-month youth loan deal. He made his senior debut in the 1–1 league draw with Dover Athletic, playing the full ninety minutes. He made five appearances during his month at the Deva Stadium, however, he turned down the option to extend his loan despite interest from Chester manager Steve Burr.

In January 2016, he instead chose to join National League rivals Gateshead on a loan deal until the end of the season, preferring to move closer to his North East roots. He was a first team regular for the club and made twenty-three appearances in all competitions, scoring twice. His performances during the spell convinced Burnley to extend his contract for a further year.

In July 2016, he joined League Two side Morecambe on a loan deal until January 2017. He made his debut in August 2016, in the opening day 2–0 defeat to Grimsby Town. He made 23 appearances for Morecambe during his loan spell, playing regularly despite missing seven games due to suspension after receiving two red cards. Later in January 2017, Whitmore returned to Morecambe until the end of the season on loan after their transfer embargo was lifted.

On 31 July 2017, Whitmore signed for Football League One side Bury on loan until January 2018. He made a total of eleven appearances in all competitions before returning to Burnley having found it difficult to hold down a first team place.

On 18 January 2018, Whitmore signed for Football League Two side Chesterfield on a -year deal.

On 30 May 2018, Whitmore signed a one-year contract with League Two side Grimsby Town on a free transfer. In June 2019, he then joined AFC Fylde.

Career statistics

External links
Alex Whitmore profile at the Grimsby Town F.C. website

References

1995 births
Living people
Footballers from Newcastle upon Tyne
English footballers
Wallsend Boys Club players
Burnley F.C. players
Chester F.C. players
Gateshead F.C. players
Morecambe F.C. players
Bury F.C. players
Chesterfield F.C. players
Grimsby Town F.C. players
AFC Fylde players
English Football League players
National League (English football) players
Association football defenders